Oliver Thompson is an English Guitar player, songwriter and singer. He has toured with Roxy Music and Bryan Ferry since 2005, playing with guitarists including Phil Manzanera, Chris Spedding and Johnny Marr. He has played on Ferry's solo tours, festival dates and recording projects since he began working with him at age 17.

He played on Ferry's 2007 solo album Dylanesque  and was the principal guitarist on the 2010  Olympia, which also featured David Gilmour, Nile Rodgers, Jonny Greenwood and Phil Manzanera. He toured with The Bryan Ferry Orchestra in 2013 for The Jazz Age. When asked in a 2013 interview about his favorite guitarists to work with, Ferry said,

Thompson was given his first guitar at 13 and soon started playing in his first band White Vinyl (2003–2007). He then started the band Rubber Kiss Goodbye (2008–2011) where he was the singer, songwriter and guitarist. The latter also included Bryan Ferry's son Tara Ferry on drums and Peter Perrett Jr. (previously of the band Babyshambles) on bass. Festival appearances for Rubber Kiss Goodbye included the 2009 SXSW in Austin, Texas, The Great Escape Festival (2010) in Brighton, England, and the Lodestar Festival in Cambridgeshire, England (2011).

In 2013, he started his first solo project, under his first two names Ollie Forrest. He launched his first single in London on 20 June 2014, featuring the songs "Gun To Your Baby" and "Wild's Rent".

Bryan Ferry studio albums
 Dylanesque (2007)
 Olympia (2010)
 Avonmore (2014)

References

External links
 Ollie Forrest at Soundcloud.com
 Ollie Forrest's "Gun To Your Baby", February 2014. YouTube.
 Review of a show at the Royal Albert Hall. November 2013. The Quietus.
 SXSW on Grooveshark, featuring Rubber Kiss Goodbye's "We See Lights". Groove Shark.
 Rubber Kiss Goodbye's "We See Lights". YouTube.

English rock guitarists
English male guitarists
1988 births
Living people
21st-century British guitarists
21st-century British male musicians